James Seward may refer to:
James Lindsay Seward (1813–1886), American politician from Georgia
James L. Seward (New York politician) (born 1951), American politician from New York
James Seward (cricketer) (born 1997), English cricketer